In mathematics, the Poincaré residue is a generalization, to several complex variables and complex manifold theory, of the residue at a pole of complex function theory. It is just one of a number of such possible extensions.

If  we recover the classical residue construction.

Historical construction 
When Poincaré first introduced residues he was studying period integrals of the form for where  was a rational differential form with poles along a divisor . Then, he gave a formula for computing this residue aswhich are both cohomologous forms.

Construction

Preliminary definition 
Notice that the standard differential  sends

Define

as the rational de-Rham cohomology groups. They form a filtrationcorresponding to the Hodge filtration.

Definition of residue 
Consider an -cycle . Since this is an -cycle, we can integrate a rational -form  and get a number. If we write this as

then we get a linear transformation on the homology classes. Homology/cohomology duality implies that this is a cohomology class

which we call the residue. This definition can be summarized as the map

Algorithm for computing this class 
Recall that the residue of a -form

Then we can write it out as

This shows that the two cohomology classes

are equal.

Example 
For example, consider the curve  defined by the polynomial

Then, we can apply the previous algorithm to compute the residue of

Since

and

we have that

This implies that

See also
 Grothendieck residue
 Leray residue
 Bott residue
 Sheaf of logarithmic differential forms
 normal crossing singularity
Adjunction formula#Poincare residue
Hodge structure
Jacobian ideal

References

Introductory

 Poincaré and algebraic geometry
Infinitesimal variations of Hodge structure and the global Torelli problem - Page 7 contains general computation formula using Cech cohomology

Higher Dimensional Residues - Mathoverflow

Advanced

References
Boris A. Khesin, Robert Wendt, The Geometry of Infinite-dimensional Groups (2008) p. 171

Several complex variables